Abel Anthony James Gower (1836 in Livorno, Italy – 1899?) was a British consul at two posts in Japan during the Bakumatsu period: Nagasaki and Hakodate. He was also an amateur photographer.

After experience in China, Gower worked in the British legation at Tōzen-ji, Edo (later Tokyo), as part of the staff of Rutherford Alcock. In 1863 he was involved in the bombardment of Kagoshima. In 1866 he became consul in Hakodate (in Ezo, later Hokkaidō); he had previously been consul in Nagasaki (in Kyūshū).

For many years it was believed that either Gower or Walter B. Woodbury was commissioned by the London firm Negretti and Zambra to photograph China and Japan between 1857 and 1860. It is now known that Pierre Rossier was the photographer in question.

Notes

References
 Bennett, Terry. Bennett, Terry. 'The Search for Rossier: Early Photographer of China and Japan' . Accessed 12 September 2006; cited above as "Bennett". Originally appeared in The PhotoHistorian-Journal of the Historical Group of  the Royal Photographic Society, December 2004.
Bakumatsu-ishin jinmei-jiten (A biographical dictionary of the Bakumatsu and Meiji revitalization). Tokyo: Shinjinbutsujūraisha, 1994. 
Nagasaki Foreign Settlement Research Group. "British Consulate." People, places and scenes from the Nagasaki foreign settlement, 1859–1941.

See also
British Japan Consular Service
Genealogy of Abel Gower by Matteo Giunti

1899 deaths
British diplomats in East Asia
British expatriates in Japan
Year of birth missing
British expatriates in China